Li Qiang is a paralympic athlete from China competing mainly in category T12 sprint events.

Li was the star of the T12 sprint events in Sydney during the 2000 Summer Paralympics winning gold in both the 100m and 200m and silver in the 400 m. In the following two Paralympics, Li failed to win any more individual medals despite competing in the same three events in each, he did however win gold as part of the Chinese 4 × 100 m relay team in both the 2004 and 2008 Summer Paralympics.

References

Paralympic athletes of China
Athletes (track and field) at the 2000 Summer Paralympics
Athletes (track and field) at the 2004 Summer Paralympics
Athletes (track and field) at the 2008 Summer Paralympics
Paralympic gold medalists for China
Paralympic silver medalists for China
Living people
Chinese male sprinters
Medalists at the 2000 Summer Paralympics
Medalists at the 2004 Summer Paralympics
Medalists at the 2008 Summer Paralympics
Year of birth missing (living people)
Paralympic medalists in athletics (track and field)
Visually impaired sprinters
Paralympic sprinters
21st-century Chinese people